Jedi Knight may refer to:

Jedi, a semi-religious faction in the Star Wars universe 
Jedi census phenomenon
Jedi Knights Trading Card Game
"Jedi Night", an episode in the fourth season of Star Wars Rebels
Star Wars: Jedi Knight, a video game series